The 2006 Australian national rugby union team tour to Europe, known in Australia as the 2006 Wallabies Spring Tour, is part of a 2006 end-of-year rugby test series and takes place in November 2006. The tour consist of test matches against Wales, Italy, Ireland and Scotland as well as midweek games against Ireland A, Scotland A and Welsh team, the Ospreys.

The tour is the first time this decade that captain George Gregan would miss out on a Wallabies tour opting to miss in preparation ahead of the 2007 Rugby World Cup with this Stirling Mortlock was named captain but missed out on the opening match due to injury. Phil Waugh was subsequently named as captain.

On 11 October, Wallabies half-back Sam Cordingley pulled out of the tour to rest a nagging foot injury, leaving Australia without their top two half-backs. Another injury concern for the Wallabies was the injury to prop Greg Holmes, who announced that he was unable to tour due to a neck injury sustained during training; Brumbies prop Nic Henderson was called into the squad.

Squad

Props
Nic Henderson
Rodney Blake
Guy Shepherdson
Al Baxter
Benn Robinson

Hookers
Brendan Cannon
Tatafu Polota-Nau
Tai McIsaac (also prop)
Stephen Moore

Locks
Nathan Sharpe
James Horwill
Mitchell Chapman
Mark Chisholm
Alister Campbell

Back row
George Smith
Rocky Elsom (also lock)
Phil Waugh (vice-captain)
Wycliff Palu
David Lyons
Scott Fava
Stephen Hoiles

Scrum-halves
Josh Valentine
Brett Sheehan

Fly-halves
Stephen Larkham (also centre) (vice-captain)
Mat Rogers (also centre, wing and fullback)
Gene Fairbanks (also centre)

Centres
Matt Giteau (also scrum-half and fly-half)
Stirling Mortlock (captain)
Adam Ashley-Cooper (also fullback)
Morgan Turinui (also wing, fly-half and flanker)

Wings
Mark Gerrard (also centre, fly-half and fullback)
Lote Tuqiri (also centre)
Clyde Rathbone (also centre)
Cameron Shepherd (also fullback)

Fullbacks
Chris Latham (vice-captain)
Drew Mitchell (also wing)
Scott Staniforth (also centre and wing)

Injured players
Dan Vickerman – Injured in test against Wales. Replaced by Mitchell Chapman.
Hugh McMeniman – Injured in match against Ospreys. Replaced by Scott Fava.
Greg Holmes – Injured in pre-tour Training. Replaced by Nic Henderson.
Sam Cordingley – Injured in pre-tour training. Replaced by Josh Valentine.
George Gregan – Opted not to tour in favour of preparation for 2007 Rugby World Cup. Not included in original squad.

Matches 

Wales: 15. Kevin Morgan, 14. Gareth Thomas, 13. Tom Shanklin, 12. Gavin Henson, 11. Shane Williams, 10. Stephen Jones (c), 9. Dwayne Peel, 8. Ryan Jones, 7. Martyn Williams, 6. Jonathan Thomas, 5. Ian Evans, 4. Ian Gough, 3. Adam Jones, 2. Matthew Rees, 1. Gethin Jenkins, – Replacements: 17. Duncan Jones, 21. James Hook – Unused: 16. T. Rhys Thomas, 18. Alun Wyn Jones, 19. Gavin Thomas, 20. Mike Phillips, 22. Mark Jones
Australia: 15. Chris Latham, 14. Clyde Rathbone, 13. Lote Tuqiri, 12. Stephen Larkham, 11. Cameron Shepherd, 10. Mat Rogers, 9. Matt Giteau, 8. Wycliff Palu, 7. Phil Waugh (c), 6. Rocky Elsom, 5. Dan Vickerman, 4. Nathan Sharpe, 3. Rodney Blake, 2. Tai McIsaac, 1. Al Baxter, – Replacements: 16. Brendan Cannon, 18. Mark Chisholm, 19. Stephen Hoiles, 20. Josh Valentine – Unused: 17. Benn Robinson, 21. Mark Gerrard, 22. Adam Ashley-Cooper

Italy: 15. Gert Peens, 14. Marko Stanojevic, 13. Gonzalo Canale, 12. Mirco Bergamasco, 11. Pablo Canavosio, 10. Ramiro Pez, 9. Paul Griffen, 8. Sergio Parisse, 7. Mauro Bergamasco, 6. Alessandro Zanni, 5. Marco Bortolami (c), 4. Santiago Dellapè, 3. Martin Castrogiovanni, 2. Carlo Festuccia, 1. Andrea Lo Cicero, – Replacements: 17. Carlos Nieto, 19. Josh Sole – Unused: 16. Leonardo Ghiraldini, 18. Carlo Del Fava, 20. Simon Picone, 21. Andrea Scanavacca, 22. Walter Pozzebon
Australia: 15. Chris Latham, 14. Clyde Rathbone, 13. Stirling Mortlock (c), 12. Stephen Larkham, 11. Lote Tuqiri, 10. Mat Rogers, 9. Matt Giteau, 8. Wycliff Palu, 7. George Smith, 6. Rocky Elsom, 5. Mark Chisholm, 4. Nathan Sharpe, 3. Guy Shepherdson, 2. Brendan Cannon, 1. Al Baxter, – Replacements: 16. Stephen Moore, 17. Nic Henderson, 18. Alister Campbell – Unused: 19. Stephen Hoiles, 20. Josh Valentine, 21. Mark Gerrard, 22. Cameron Shepherd

Ireland: 15. Geordan Murphy, 14. Shane Horgan, 13. Brian O'Driscoll (c), 12. Gordon D'Arcy, 11. Denis Hickie, 10. Ronan O'Gara, 9. Isaac Boss, 8. Denis Leamy, 7. David Wallace, 6. Neil Best, 5. Paul O'Connell, 4. Donncha O'Callaghan, 3. John Hayes, 2. Rory Best, 1. Bryan Young, – Replacements: 16. Frankie Sheahan, 17. Marcus Horan, 18. Malcolm O'Kelly, 19. Simon Easterby, 20. Peter Stringer, 21. Paddy Wallace, 22. Girvan Dempsey
Australia: 15. Chris Latham, 14. Clyde Rathbone, 13. Lote Tuqiri, 12. Stirling Mortlock (c), 11. Mark Gerrard, 10. Stephen Larkham, 9. Matt Giteau, 8. Wycliff Palu, 7. Phil Waugh, 6. Rocky Elsom, 5. Mark Chisholm, 4. Nathan Sharpe, 3. Guy Shepherdson, 2. Tai McIsaac, 1. Al Baxter, – Replacements: 16. Stephen Moore, 17. Benn Robinson, 18. Alister Campbell, 19. George Smith, 20. Josh Valentine, 21. Mat Rogers, 22. Scott Staniforth

Scotland: 15. Chris Paterson (c), 14. Sean Lamont, 13. Marcus Di Rollo, 12. Andrew Henderson, 11. Simon Webster, 10. Dan Parks, 9. Mike Blair, 8. David Callam, 7. Kelly Brown, 6. Simon Taylor, 5. Scott Murray, 4. Alastair Kellock, 3. Euan Murray, 2. Dougie Hall, 1. Gavin Kerr, – Replacements: 16. Ross Ford, 17. Allan Jacobsen, 18. Jim Hamilton, 19. Alasdair Strokosch, 20. Rory Lawson, 21. Phil Godman, 22. Hugo Southwell
Australia: 15. Chris Latham, 14. Mark Gerrard, 13. Stirling Mortlock (c), 12. Scott Staniforth, 11. Lote Tuqiri, 10. Stephen Larkham, 9. Matt Giteau, 8. David Lyons, 7. George Smith, 6. Rocky Elsom, 5. Alister Campbell, 4. Nathan Sharpe, 3. Guy Shepherdson, 2. Stephen Moore, 1. Benn Robinson, – Replacements: 16. Tatafu Polota-Nau, 17. Al Baxter, 18. Mark Chisholm, 19. Phil Waugh, 20. Wycliff Palu, 21. Josh Valentine, 22. Mat Rogers

See also
2006 end-of-year rugby union tests
The Wallabies
Australia A
Ireland
Gli Azzurri
Scotland
Wales

References

External links
Tour Schedule
Gregan Pulls out of Tour
Mortlock to miss Spring Tour Opener
Spring Tour Squad Announced
Holmes to Miss Tour
Ospreys Review
Wales Review
Italy Review
Ireland A Review
Ireland Review
Scotland A Review
Scotland Review

2006
2006
2006
2006
2006
2006 rugby union tours
2006–07 in European rugby union
2006 in Australian rugby union
2006–07 in Welsh rugby union
2006–07 in Irish rugby union
2006–07 in English rugby union
2006–07 in Scottish rugby union
2006–07 in French rugby union
2006–07 in Italian rugby union